Pierre Dumonstier may refer to:
Pierre Dumonstier I
Pierre Dumonstier II